Blues by Lonnie Johnson is an album by blues musician Lonnie Johnson, recorded in 1960 and released on the Bluesville label.

Reception

AllMusic reviewer Scott Yanow stated: "After four years off records and in obscurity, Lonnie Johnson launched his final comeback with this release ... Johnson sings and plays guitar on a variety of blues, showing that the layoff (he was working at the time as a janitor) had not hurt his abilities in the slightest".

Track listing
All compositions by Lonnie Johnson
 "Don't Ever Love" – 3:33
 "No Love for Sale" – 3:02
 "There's No Love" – 2:25
 "I Don't Hurt Anymore" – 3:53
 "She-Devil" – 2:53
 "One-Sided Love Affair" – 3:12
 "Big Leg Woman" – 3:11
 "There Must Be a Way" – 3:23
 "She's Drunk Again" – 3:21
 "Blues 'Round My Door" – 3:33
 "You Don't Move Me" – 2:12
 "You Will Need Me" – 3:27

Personnel

Performance
Lonnie Johnson – guitar, vocals
Hal Singer – tenor saxophone
Claude Hopkins – piano
Wendell Marshall – bass
Bobby Donaldson – drums

Production
Chris Albertson – supervision
 Rudy Van Gelder – engineer

References

Lonnie Johnson (musician) albums
1960 albums
Bluesville Records albums
Albums recorded at Van Gelder Studio